Jairo Izquierdo González (born 22 October 1993), sometimes known as just Jairo, is a Spanish professional footballer who plays as either a left back or a left winger for FC Cartagena.

Club career
Born in Santa Cruz de Tenerife, Canary Islands, Jairo graduated with CD Tenerife's youth setup. He made his debuts as a senior with the reserves in 2011, in Tercera División.

On 2 July 2014 Jairo signed a new three-year deal with the club, being promoted to the main squad in Segunda División. On 1 September, however, he was loaned to Segunda División B side Real Murcia, in a season-long deal.

On 5 September 2015 Jairo made his professional debut, coming on as a second-half substitute for Omar Perdomo in a 1–1 away draw against SD Huesca. On 17 January 2017, after making no appearances during the campaign, he left the club by mutual consent and joined UD Melilla just hours later.

On 18 August 2018, Jairo signed a four-year contract with Girona FC in La Liga. Eleven days later, he was loaned to second division side Cádiz CF for the season.

Upon returning from loan, Jairo spent the 2019–20 campaign with his parent club, now also in the second division. On 5 October 2020, he returned to Cádiz, again in a one-year loan deal.

Jairo returned to Girona in July 2021, and was converted into a left back during the pre-season, subsequently picking up the number 3 jersey. On 8 July 2022, after the club's promotion to the top tier, he moved to FC Cartagena in the second division on a two-year deal.

Career statistics

Club

References

External links

1993 births
Living people
Spanish footballers
Footballers from Santa Cruz de Tenerife
Association football defenders
Association football wingers
La Liga players
Segunda División players
Segunda División B players
Tercera División players
CD Tenerife B players
CD Tenerife players
Real Murcia players
UD Melilla footballers
Extremadura UD footballers
Girona FC players
Cádiz CF players
FC Cartagena footballers